Pematangsiantar (sometimes written as Pematang Siantar, acronym PS or P. Siantar, colloquially just Siantar), and also known as the City of Pematangsiantar, is an independent city in North Sumatra, Indonesia, surrounded by, but not part of, the Simalungun Regency, making Pematangsiantar an enclave within Simalungun Regency. Pematangsiantar formerly had the status of a second level district (daerah tingkat dua) and was the administrative centre of the surrounding Regency, but it has recently been elevated to Kota (City) and separated from the Regency.

Its population was 229,525 in the 2005 Intermediate Census, 234,698 in the 2010 Census, 247,219 in the 2015 Intermediate Census, and 268,254 at the 2020 Census. making it the second largest city in the province after the provincial capital of Medan.

Pematangsiantar city, which is only 128 km from Medan and 50 km from Parapat, is often a transit city for tourists who want to go to Lake Toba and Central Tapanuli Regency. As a city that supports tourism in the surrounding area, this city has 8 hotels, 10 budget hotels and 268 restaurants. In this city there are still many motorcycles of The Birmingham Small Arms Company (BSA) with a capacity of 500 cc made in England, the old model that used as Auto rickshaw that makes a loud sound.

The city had received the Adipura Cup in 1993 for its cleanliness and environmental sustainability. Meanwhile, because of the orderly traffic control, the city also won the Wahana Tata Nugraha Cup award in 1996. The industrial sector which is the backbone of the city's economy, which is located in the middle of Simalungun Regency, is a large and medium industry. Of the total economic activities, in 2000 this city reached Rp1.69 trillion, the industrial market share reached 38.18% or Rp646 billion. The trade, hotel and restaurant sector followed in second place, with a contribution of 22.77% or Rp385 billion.

The motto of this city is Sapangambei Manoktok Hitei which comes from the Simalungun language which means working together to achieve a noble goal.

History
Before 1907, Pematangsiantar was a Kingdom led by the Damanik. Damanik is one of the clans of the Simalungun ethnic group of the Batak people. The last king of the dynasty was Tuan Sangnawaluh Damanik. In 1907, the Dutch took control, turning Pematangsiantar into their colony. The city remained under Dutch control until 1942 when the Japanese invaded and ruled over Indonesia.

After Indonesia proclaimed its freedom in 1945, Pematangsiantar was granted autonomous status. In 1974, Pematangsiantar became a second level district, and was appointed as the capital of Simalungun Regency.

Siantar Kingdom 
Before the Proclamation of Independence of the Republic of Indonesia, Pematangsiantar was a royal town. Pematangsiantar is domiciled on Pulau Holing and the last king of this dynasty is a descendant of the Damanik clan, namely Tuan Sang Nawaluh Damanik who held power as king in 1906.

Around Pulau Holing then developed into a village where residents lived including the villages of Suhi Haluan, Siantar Bayu, Suhi Kahean, Pantoan, Suhi Bah Bosar, and Tomuan. These areas later became the legal areas of Pematangsiantar City, namely:

 Pulau Holing becomes Kampung Pematang
 Siantar Bayu becomes the Siantar city-center
 Suhi Kahean became Kampung Sipinggol-pinggol, Kampung Melayu, Martoba, Sukadame, and Bane.
 Suhi Bah Bosar became a Kampung Kristen, Karo, Tomuan, Pantoan, Toba and Marimbang.

Dutch and Japanese Colonial Era 

After the Dutch entered the North Sumatra, the Simalungun area became the Dutch territory, so that in 1907 the reign of the kings ended. The Dutch controller, who was originally based in Commerce, was transferred to Pematangsiantar in 1907. Since then Pematangsiantar has developed into an area visited by many newcomers, the chinese, and indian inhabit the Timbang Galung and Kampung Melayu area, meanwhile the javanese in Tanah Jawa.

In 1910 the Pematangsiantar City Preparatory Agency was established. Then on July 1, 1917 based on Stad Blad No. 285 Pematangsiantar turned into Gemeente (dutch-style administrative division) which has its own autonomy. Since January 1939 under Stad Blad No. 717 changes to Gemente which has a Council.

In the Japanese era changed to Siantar State and the Council was abolished. After the proclamation of independence, Pematangsiantar again became an Autonomous Region. Based on Law No. 22/1948, Gemente's status became the City of Simalungun Regency and the Mayor was concurrently the Regent of Simalungun until 1957.

Independence and Contemporary Era 
Based on Law No.1/1957 it was changed to a Full City Praja and with the issuance of Law No.18/1965 it changed to a City, and with the issuance of Law no. 5/1974 concerning the Principles of Regional Government changed to Pematangsiantar Level II Regional City until now.

Based on Government Regulation No. 35 of 1981, Pematangsiantar Level II Regional City is divided into four sub-districts consisting of 29 villages/kelurahan with an area of 12.48 km² which was inaugurated by the Governor of North Sumatra on March 17, 1982. Thus the number of sub-districts in Pematangsiantar City is eight sub-districts with a total of fifty-three sub-districts.

Geography 
Because it is located near the equator, Pematangsiantar City belongs to the tropics and flat, temperate climates with an average maximum temperature of 30.3 Celsius and an average minimum temperature of 21.1 Celsius in 2012.

During 2012, the average humidity was 84 percent. The highest average in October and December each reached 88 percent, while the average rainfall was 229 mm where the highest rainfall occurred in April which reached 341 mm.

Climate 
Pematangsiantar has a tropical rainforest climate (Af) with heavy rainfall year-round. The temperatures are slightly moderated by its elevation.

Governance 
The mayor is the highest leader in the Pematangsiantar government. The mayor of Pematangsiantar is responsible to the governor of the province of North Sumatra. Currently, the regional head who serves in Pematangsiantar City is the deputy mayor of the city, Susanti Dewayani. Previously, in the 2020 Pematangsiantar Mayoral Election, Susanti Dewayani was a candidate for deputy mayor, along with mayoral candidate Asner Silalahi, and they won the election for the period 2021-2024. However, Asner passed away before being officially sworn ceremony.

Then, Susanti was officially inaugurated as deputy mayor as the winner of the regional election, by the governor of North Sumatra, Edy Rahmayadi, on February 22, 2022 at the North Sumatra governor's office, Medan City. While the position of mayor is still vacant. Furthermore, the Pematangsiantar City Council will hold a meeting to elect a deputy mayor, and Susanti Dewayani will then be appointed as Pematangsiantar mayor for the 2022-2024 period. Susanti Dewayani replaces the pair Hefriansyah–Togar Sitorus for the 2017-2022 period.

Administrative divisions 

The city is divided administratively into eight districts (kecamatan), tabulated below with their areas and their populations at the 2010 Census and 2020 Census.

Demographics
In 2015 the population of Pematangsiantar City reached 247,411 people with a population density of 3,093.86 people per km². The female population in Pematangsiantar City is more than the male population. In 2015 the population of Pematangsiantar City, which were male, amounted to 120,597 people and the female population was 126,814 people. Thus the sex ratio of the population of Pematangsiantar City is 95.10.

Ethnics, Languages and Religion 
Batak people, especially Toba and Simalungun is the major ethnic groups in Pematangsiantar with sizeable Javanese and Chinese meanwhile the rest ethnics are Minangkabau, Indian, Acehnese and others.

According to 2010 Indonesian census, the majority of Pematangsiantar's inhabitants are following Christian with 51.25 percent and Muslim with 43.9 percent. Around 4.36 percent are Buddhists, and there are smaller numbers of Hindus and followers of Confucianism, this are proven by the existence with various houses of worship such as mosque, church, catholic church, buddhist temple and hindu temple.

The major language in Pematangsiantar are Indonesian and Batak, both languages become lingua franca that spoken among all ethnics in the city. The Javanese are speaking Javanese as second languages, this applies also to Chinese which speaking both Hokkien and Hainanese, Indian speaking Tamil, and other ethics respectively.

Economy 
Pematangsiantar's economy in 2020 when compared to the previous year grew negatively by -1.89 percent. Based on the production approach, the highest growth was achieved by the Electricity and Gas Procurement business field of 2.24 percent. Followed by the Information and Communication business sector by 2.00 percent and the Agriculture, Forestry and Fisheries business field at 1.05 percent.
 Based on the expenditure approach, the Consumption Expenditure component of LNPRT achieved the highest growth of 0.36 percent.
 Three business fields that give a dominant role to Pematangsiantar's GRDP in terms of production in 2020, namely: Wholesale and Retail Trade; Car and Motorcycle Repair by 25.28 percent, Manufacturing Industry by 21.51 percent and Construction by 10.15 percent. Meanwhile, from the expenditure side, the Household Consumption Expenditure (PKRT) component gave the largest contribution at 58.54 percent, following the PMTB component at 24.81 percent as the component with the second largest contribution.
 In nominal terms, Pematangsiantar's GRDP in 2020 at current prices reached Rp. 13,920.09 billion and GRDP at constant prices in 2010 reached Rp. 9,430.04 billion.

Culture

Landmark and tourism 

It is common to see tourists stopping over in Pematangsiantar. Siantar is famous for its Batak culture, 'Batik' and 'Ulos' fabric, and Batak foods. There is a zoo that worth visiting that is named as Taman Hewan Pematangsiantar - animal garden of Pematangsiantar (Kebun Binatang Pemetangsiantar in Indonesian). It has a good collection of Indonesian native animals, most notably birds, tigers and apes. The zoo itself boasts abundant tropical trees and plants, some of which are quite old. The location is close to the main roads of the city (within walking distance). Ticket price (April 2009) is 7,000 IDR.

Another place of interest in the city is Vihara Avalokitesvara - a Buddhist Temple housing the Statue of Kwan Im. At 22.8 meter high, is the tallest statue of its kind in Indonesia. The temple complex is accessible from Jl. Pane. It is part of a new temple complex. Adjacent to the new complex and connected by a bridge across the river of Bah Bolon, the old building of the temple was burned completely in an inferno in May, 2008. Another landmark and tourism spot are :
 Siantar Waterpark
 Siantar becak statue
 Horas market
 Simalungun Museum
 Zoologi Museum
 Siantar Botanic Park

Cuisine 
Most of Pematangsiantar's food styles are inherited from Batak traditional food. Foods such as saksang (pork cooked in its own blood) and roasted pork, or drinks like tuak (an alcoholic beverage made from sugar palm and sometimes from coconut) prepared by the Batak people are very popular. Halal food is easy to found in this city, many nasi padang, satay, bakso seller are scattered everywhere in Pematangsiantar.

Roti Ganda is the most famous souvenirs from Pematangsiantar, the plain pillow bread is greased with Kaya or Serikaya, other variants are pandan leaf jam, chocolate and cheese. Bakmi Siantar and Kok Tong Kopitiam coffee is another famous cuisine among chinese community from Siantar.

Transportation 
Pematangsiantar can be reached from Medan by train, there are daily train line that connect Medan station to Siantar station, named Siantar Express. There are also large buses which connect Siantar to Medan 130 kilometres away, about a 3-hour trip. The nearest airport is Kualanamu International Airport located around 70 km from the city, currently there are ongoing construction of a toll road that will connect Pematangsiantar to other cities such as Tebingtinggi, Kualanamu airport, and the capital Medan.

References

 
Populated places in North Sumatra
Cities in Indonesia